Dargeh-ye Gholam Ali (also Romanized as Dargeh-ye Gholām ‘Alī; also known as Darkeh-ye Gholām ‘Alī) is a village in Mahidasht Rural District, Mahidasht District, Kermanshah County, Kermanshah Province, Iran. At the 2006 census, its population was 115, in 27 families.

References 

Populated places in Kermanshah County